Divenire (in English "to become") is a music album by the Italian composer Ludovico Einaudi. Released in 2006, the album includes his critically acclaimed track "Primavera". Shortly after its release, Einaudi went on tour to various places in the UK, playing both the music on Divenire and orchestral arrangements of his most famous works to promote the album. It was recorded by the Royal Liverpool Philharmonic Orchestra conducted by Robert Ziegler with the composer, Ludovico Einaudi, as the piano Master.

The 2011 movie The Intouchables uses several Einaudi pieces in its soundtrack, including "Fly" and "L'origine nascosta".

Track listing

Critical reception 

The album has received positive reviews from music critics. AllMusic's James Manheim wrote "They (the tracks) are artfully done, stepping up to the line of pure schlock but not crossing over, and using the simplicity of minimalist patterns to rope audiences into something that's actually slightly different." Sputnikmusic gave the album 4.5 stars saying "Divenire is filled with piano compositions that capture the attention and emotions of listeners and probably won't give them back." Classic FM wrote that the title track is "A piece that builds from a simple piano chord sequence to a swirling hive of activity."

Charts

Album

"Fly"

Certifications and sales

References

2006 compositions
2006 classical albums
Ludovico Einaudi albums